Balochistan Police or Baloch Police (Baloch, Urdu: بلوچستان پولیس) is responsible for policing urban Balochistan, Pakistan. Its strength is 38,000 as of 2018. The current Inspector General of Police, Balochistan is Abdul Khalique Shaikh.

Law enforcement in Balochistan

Balochistan Police is responsible for the law and order situation in mostly urban areas only, which are called A areas. This division has been in place, in various forms, since the time of the British Raj. Balochistan's rural areas, called B areas, are policed by the Balochistan Levies. The Frontier Corps operates in both areas. This division is seen as a severe handicap by the police as criminals based outside their limited area of jurisdiction can easily plan attacks and run away.

The distinction was eliminated by Musharraf, however, it was brought back by the PPP government of 2008 under CM Balochistan Aslam Raisani. The frequent swings in policy obviously do not allow institution-building and hurt the agencies' abilities to deal with crime.

Since Pakistan's post 9/11 involvement in the Global War on Terror targeted killings, kidnappings, and terrorist attacks have risen substantially. In 2013 there were several bombings targeting the Hazara community in Quetta. and attacks on police including senior officials.

2008 - 2013 PPP Rule 

PPP formed a government in Balochistan and ruled in a coalition with Nawab Aslam Raisani as Chief Minister. Aslam Raisana chose Humayan Joegazai as CCPO Quetta, who was known to have close links with lashkar-e-Jhangvi. During the start of his career, he ordered policemen to fire live rounds at Hazara protesters. 25 innocent civilians were killed. He was brought back to Quetta by Raisani and during his tenure, things once again took a turn for the worse, particularly for the Hazara community.

Improvement in 2014 

The number of terrorist attacks dropped from 205 in 2013 to 154 in 2014 (a 25 percent decline) and the number of people killed in terrorist attacks fell from around 350 in 2013 to 48 in 2014 (an 86 percent decline).

Organization 

Balochistan Constabulary, a reserve police unit of Balochistan police consisting of more than 10,000 personnel  located in the districts of Kharan and Khuzdar, was converted to a unit of Frontier Corps (Balochistan) and named the Kharan Rifles. It was organized at Khuzdar and then moved its HQ to Nokkundi in 1978. The personnel of the constabulary units were then organized as 75 Wing and 76 Wing, while 84 Wing of Chagai Militia was detached from that unit and placed under a command given the name "Kharan Rifles".

Designations
Designations of Balochistan Police are as follow:

Posts
SHO, SDPO, DPO, CCPO, RPO and PPO are posts, not ranks. So you may see a lower rank acting at a higher post for some time.

IGPs of Balochistan Police

See also
Frontier Corps, the paramilitary law enforcement wing in Balochistan
Law enforcement in Pakistan
Khyber Pakhtunkhwa Police
Punjab Police
Sindh Police

References

External links
 Official website

1963 establishments in Pakistan
 
Government agencies established in 1963
Provincial law enforcement agencies of Pakistan